The gospel or good news is a theological concept in several religions. In the historical Roman imperial cult and today in Christianity, the gospel is a message about salvation by a divine figure, a savior, who has brought peace or other benefits to humankind. In Ancient Greek religion, the word designated a type of sacrifice or ritual dedication intended to thank the gods upon receiving good news.

The religious concept dates back at least as far as Greece's Classical era. Roman authors are known to have adopted it toward the end of the 1st century BCE, and Christians somewhat later. It is a central message of Christianity today, in which written accounts of the life and teaching of Jesus Christ are known as Gospels.

Etymology
Gospel is the Old English translation of Greek , meaning "good news".

In Greek the term originally designed a reward or tip customarily paid to a messenger who has delivered good news. The term then came to designate the good news itself, and also a religious offering of thanks for good fortune.

In Greek and Roman religion

Classical Greece

In Ancient Greek religion the word εὐαγγέλια means a sacrifice offered for good tidings or good news. Like other Greek religious thanks-offerings, gospel offerings took the form of animal sacrifice, offerings of food and drink, and ritual dedications. News of military victory was frequently celebrated with a gospel offering. In the play The Knights by Aristophanes of 424 BCE, the comic character Paphlagon proposes an excessive sacrifice of a hundred heifers to Athena to celebrate good news. This word in Greek has a double meaning: the singular form means a reward paid to a human messenger who brings good news, and the plural form means a thanks-offering to the gods for good news.

Rome
The Roman Imperial cult celebrated the gospel of the August One or Divus Augustus, a mythologized version of the first Roman emperor Octavian, also known as Augustus Caesar. Augustus was both a man and a god, "a savior who has made war to cease and who shall put everything in peaceful order." This period of peace is called the Pax Romana. To celebrate the good tidings of peace with an unusually grand gospel offering, governor Paullus Fabius Maximus suggested the ritual dedication of the calendar to Augustus, starting the new year on Augustus's birthday. This dedication to the August One served to synchronize diverse local calendars across the Empire, and is the origin of the name of the month August. The idea of dedication to a divine king's birthday later formed the basis of the Julian and Gregorian calendars. 

One implementation of this gospel calendar dedication is recorded the Calendar Inscription of Priene. In it, the Koine Greek word for "good news" appears in celebrating the birth of the god and savior Augustus, sent by Providence to bring peace. It announces the intention of the city of Priene to change their calendar so that it begins on the birthday of Augustus, the first day of the good news. The Priene inscription is the most famous pre-Christian use of the concept of the gospel. Dated to 9 BCE, a few years before the birth of Jesus, the inscription demonstrates that the gospel was used as a political term before it was applied to Christianity.

In the Bible and Christianity

Hebrew scripture

The ancient Hebrew noun  (besorah) appears to carry the same double meaning as the equivalent Greek word for gospel, used for both a messenger delivering good news and a thanks-offering to a god upon receiving good news. The noun and verb forms are used several times in the Hebrew Bible.

When Jewish scriptures were adopted by Christians as the Old Testament, these mentions of good news came to be viewed as prefiguring the later story of Jesus in the New Testament.

New Testament

The Gospels

A genre of ancient biographies of Jesus took on the name Gospel because they tell good news of Jesus as the Christian savior, bringing peace and acting as a sacrifice who has redeemed mankind from sin. The first four books of the Christian New Testament are the canonical gospels: Matthew, Mark, Luke, and John. In addition, a number of non-canonical gospels give accounts of the life of Jesus but are not officially included in the Christian Bible.

In the Pauline epistles
Paul gave the following summary, one of the earliest Christian Creeds, (translated into English) of this good news (gospel) in the First Epistle to the Corinthians:

Paul describes the gospel as being powerful and salvific:For I am not ashamed of the gospel, because it is the power of God that brings salvation to everyone who believes: first to the Jew, then to the Gentile.

Romans 1:16

In Acts

The good news can be summarized in many ways, reflecting various emphases. C. H. Dodd has summarized the Christian good news as taught by the apostle Peter in the Acts of the Apostles:

 The age of fulfilment has dawned;
 This has taken place through the ministry, death, and resurrection of Jesus;
 By virtue of the resurrection, Jesus has been exalted at the right hand of God, as Messianic head of the new Israel;
 The Holy Spirit in the Church is the sign of Christ's present power and glory;
 The Messianic Age will shortly reach its consummation in the return of Christ.

In various Christian movements

The good news is described in many different ways in the Bible. Each one reflects different emphases, and describes part or all of the biblical narrative. Christian teaching of the good news—including the preaching of the Apostles in the Book of Acts—generally focuses upon the resurrection of Jesus and its implications. Sometimes in the Bible, the good news is described in other terms, but it still describes God's saving acts. For example, the Apostle Paul taught that the good news was announced to the patriarch Abraham in the words, "All nations will be blessed through you." (Galatians 3:6–9; c.f. Genesis 12:1–3).

Liberation theology
Liberation theology, articulated in the teachings of Latin American Catholic theologians Leonardo Boff and Gustavo Gutiérrez, emphasizes that Jesus came not only to save humanity, but also to liberate the poor and oppressed. A similar movement among the Latin American evangelical movement is the integral mission, in which the church is seen as an agent for positively transforming the wider world, in response to the good news. This can likewise be seen in black theology of certain African and African American Christians.

Christian mission

The Christian missions movement believes the Christian good news to be a message for all peoples, of all nations, tribes, cultures and languages. This movement teaches that it is through the good news of Jesus that the nations of humanity are restored to relationship with God and that the destiny of the nations is related to this process. Missiology professor Howard A. Snyder writes, "God has chosen to place the Church with Christ at the very center of His plan to reconcile the world to himself".

Another perspective described in the Pauline epistles is that it is through the good news of Jesus' death and resurrection, and the resulting worship of people from all nations, that evil is defeated on a cosmic scale. Reflecting on the third chapter of Ephesians 3, theologian Howard A. Snyder writes:

See also
 Atonement
 Evangelism
 Gospel
 Messiah
 Ministry of Jesus
 Threefold office

Notes

Footnotes

Sources

References
Dodd, C. H. 1964 The Apostolic Preaching and its Developments  Harper and Row.
General Directory for Catechesis 1997, Congregation for the Clergy
Goldsworthy, G, 1991, According to Plan: The Unfolding Revelation of God in the Bible Sydney: Lancer Press.
Johnstone, P, 2001, Operation World, Carlisle, UK: Paternoster Lifestyle.
Köstenberger, A and P. O'Brien, 2001, Salvation to the Ends of the Earth: A Biblical Theology of Mission New Studies in Biblical Theology 11, Leicester: Apollos.
Padilla, R, 2004, 'An Ecclesiology for Integral Mission,' in The Local Church, Agent of Transformation: An Ecclesiology for Integral Mission, T. Yamamori and C. R. Padilla, eds, Buenos Aires: Kairos Ediciones.
Snyder, H. A., 1999, 'The Church in God's Plan,' in Perspectives on the World Christian Movement, 3rd edn, Pasadena, California: William Carey Library.
Jepsen, Bent Kim, 2009 The Origin of Good News

External links
 Catholic Encyclopedia: Judaizers - Concerning the cultural implications of the Good News
 Catholic Encyclopedia: Salvation
 Lordship salvation- Reformed Christian Gospel presentation emphasizing Lordship Salvation 

Christian terminology
Christian missions
Christology
Heresy in Judaism
Life of Jesus in the New Testament
Missional Christianity
New Testament words and phrases
Salvation